David Morris (born 20 September 1957) is a Welsh former professional footballer who played as a striker in the Football League for York City, and was on the books of Manchester United without making a league appearance.

References

1957 births
Living people
Footballers from Swansea
Welsh footballers
Association football forwards
Manchester United F.C. players
York City F.C. players
English Football League players